Edward Emory Warner (June 20, 1889 – February 5, 1954) was a Major League Baseball pitcher who played in  with the Pittsburgh Pirates. He batted right-handed and threw left-handed.

He was born in Fitchburg, Massachusetts, and died in New York City.

External links

1889 births
1954 deaths
Major League Baseball pitchers
Baseball players from Massachusetts
Pittsburgh Pirates players